

Arthropoda

Newly named insects

Archosauromorphs
 AMNH 5244, a ceratopsian braincase, was found isolated during an American Museum of Natural History Barnum Brown-led expedition.

Newly named phytosaurs

Newly named basal dinosauriforms

Newly named dinosaurs
Data courtesy of George Olshevsky's dinosaur genera list.

Synapsids

Non-mammalian

Footnotes

References
 Makovicky, P. J., 2001, A Montanoceratops cerorhynchus (Dinosauria: Ceratopsia)  braincase from the Horseshoe Canyon Formation of Alberta: In: Mesozoic Vertebrate  Life, edited by Tanke, D. H., and Carpenter, K., Indiana University Press,  pp. 243–262.